Mesa Ridge High School is a school in Widefield School District 3, a school district in El Paso County, Colorado. The school is zoned to receive students from Fountain, and the Colorado Springs suburbs of Security and Widefield. Mesa Ridge opened in 1997. The first graduating class commenced in 1999. Mesa Ridge is the newest of three high schools in the district, after Widefield High School and Discovery High School.

Academics
Mesa Ridge is a comprehensive public high school offering traditional high school courses as well as honors and Advanced Placement, Career & Technical Programs, and Concurrent Enrollment. 

Career & Technical (CTE) Programs include Automotive Services; Business Management & Marketing; Cabinetry and General Construction through the MiLL; Cosmetology through ISSA; Information Technology; and Work-Based Learning.

Mesa Ridge also offers Project Lead the Way (PLTW), a national program that brings together industry, higher education, and public schools to prepare students for post-secondary careers. Students can study Biomedical Science and Engineering.

Mesa Ridge is also an AVID (Advancement Via Individual Determination) school.  AVID is a national program designed to close college opportunity gaps. In 2021, 100% of Mesa Ridge students enrolled in AVID were accepted to 2-year or 4-year colleges.

Activities 
Mesa Ridge High School has many clubs, organizations and activities. In 2021, the school offered nearly 30 clubs for students to participate in, as well as co-curricular programs like Marching Band, Sources of Strength, Yearbook, Student Cabinet, and NJROTC.

Marching band 
 In 2009, The Pride of Mesa Ridge received the GRAMMY Signature Schools Enterprise Award and $5000 from the GRAMMY Foundation.

NJROTC 
 The NJROTC unit won the Colorado Navy Drill, Physical Fitness and Academic Championship 15 years in a row (2000-2014).

Winter guard & percussion ensemble 
 The Winter Guard team has won four State Championships (2001, 2006, 2012, 2022).
 The Mesa Ridge Percussion Ensemble won State in 2012.

Other activities
 The mathematics club has had distinguished achievements, including a first-place finish in the 2005 Colorado State University-Pueblo mathematics competition. The team has produced honorable mentions several times in school history.

Athletics
Mesa Ridge offers the following athletic programs:

 Baseball
 Basketball (men's/women's)
 Cheer (co-ed)
 Cross Country
 Football
 Golf (men's/women's)
 Soccer (men's/women's)
 Softball
 Swimming (men's/women's). This is a combined team with Widefield High School. Athletes are known as the Grizzliators.
 Tennis (men's/women's)
 Track & Field
 Volleyball (women's)
 Volleyball (men's). This is a combined team with Widefield High School. Athletes are known as the Grizzliators.
 Wrestling (men's/women's)

Achievements

Basketball (women's) 

 In 2014, the team won the 4A State Championship title.

Basketball (men's) 

 In 2023, the team won the 5A State Championship title.

Winter Guard 

 In 2022, the team won the State Championship title.

Notable alumni 

 Kylie Shook (Class of 2016). WNBA (New York Liberty).

External links

 Widefield School District 3

References

High schools in Colorado Springs, Colorado
Schools in El Paso County, Colorado
Fountain, Colorado
Educational institutions established in 1997
Public high schools in Colorado
1997 establishments in Colorado